Do Ladkiyan is a 1976 Bollywood film directed by Kotayya Pratyagatma.

Cast 
Sanjeev Kumar   
Mala Sinha

Soundtrack

External links
 

1976 films
1970s Hindi-language films
Films scored by Laxmikant–Pyarelal
Films directed by Kotayya Pratyagatma